Poetics of Cinema is a book series of film theory by Chilean filmmaker Raúl Ruiz (1941-2011) consisting principally of lectures he gave in diverse locations between 1990 and 2009.

Overview
In Poetics of Cinema 1: Miscellanies (1995), Ruiz outlines his rejection of John Howard Lawson's central conflict theory and makes a case for unique, enigmatic boredom in film. In Poetics of Cinema 2 (2006), he addresses the notions of fascination and detachment with respect to the film-image. In the third volume (published posthumously in Spanish in 2013) he takes on Sergei Eisenstein's writings and describes his own work on La Recta Provincia and Nucingen House.

In a March 2016 Lincoln Center masterclass, Ruiz's regular actor Melvil Poupaud said of Ruiz that: "He was more political in an aesthetic way than just a director. For instance, the book he wrote when he was a teacher in Harvard at the beginning of the nineties are still very important for me. I read them and I understand them more and more and it's his vision poetical but mostly political finally that matters more and more to my mind... It's very important I think to read it especially nowadays because he was very visionary especially on the narrative theory that is now so important to those TV shows all around the world and he had a very interesting theory about ways of controlling inspiration like the weapon."

See also
 Historical poetics

References

External links
Towards a Perverse Neo-Baroque Cinematic Aesthetic: Raúl Ruiz’s Poetics of Cinema 2004 article by Michael Goddard.
Poetics of Cinema 2 by Raúl Ruiz 2007 article by Strictly Film School.
The Mystery, as Always: Raúl Ruiz, Klimt and the Poetics of Cinema 2007 article by James Norton.
Filming Vienna 1900: The Poetics of Cinema and the Politics of Ornament in Raúl Ruiz’s Klimt 2013 article by Janet Stewart.

1995 non-fiction books
2006 non-fiction books
Academic works about film theory
Books of film theory
Books about film